Rotylenchulidae is a family of nematodes belonging to the order Rhabditida.

Genera:
 Acontylus Meagher, 1968 
 Bilobodera Sharma & Siddiqi, 1992 
 Rotylenchulus Linford & Oliveira, 1940 
 Senegalonema Germani, Luc & Baldwin, 1984

References

Nematodes